Joe Corrales Jr., also known as Yppah (pronounced "Yippah"), is an American electronic/rock musician. He is currently signed to Future Archive Recordings and resides in Long Beach, California, United States.

In 2020, Joe Corrales Jr. earned a RIAA Gold Certified Single for the use of the Yppah song, "Never Mess With Sunday" by Lil Peep on the song "Star Shopping".

History

Early years
Corrales began playing guitar and bass in rock bands during high school, and later became more involved in electronic music and turntablism. He was involved in the early creation of mashups, and was part of a turntablist group called The Truth. Yppah is influenced by shoegaze, various electronic music, psychedelic soul, and rock music, evidenced by heavy use of reverb, effects, and electronics.

You Are Beautiful At All Times
His first album, titled You Are Beautiful at All Times, was released in 2006 on Ninja Tune records. The single "Again With The Subtitles" was released immediately prior to the album, and is featured in the film, 21. "It's Not The Same," a song from the album, was used in a trailer for Alone in the Dark, as well as the episode "Last Resort" from the series House. Similarly, the song "In Two, the Weakly" is featured in the CSI episode "Ending Happy".

They Know What Ghost Know
They Know What Ghost Know released on May 18, 2009 in the UK, Japan and Australia. The U.S. release date was June 23, 2009. Released to positive reviews, the album has a more pronounced shoegaze and psychedelic sound with "lush" instrumentation. The album crosses into numerous genres, with NME associating it with other DJ-based albums while other reviewers referring to it as "big beat".

Eighty One
Eighty One released on February 4, 2012 in Japan and April 2, 2012 worldwide to critical acclaim. Eighty One is Yppah's most widely received album to date, with the singles "Film Burn" (feat. Anomie Belle) and "D Song" (feat. Anomie Belle) charting on radio stations across North America and Japan. Eighty One features several guest appearances by Seattle artist Anomie Belle who Corrales met when the two artists performed together on tour with Bonobo. Anomie Belle has also appeared with Yppah during live performances, performing on guitar, keys, violin, drum machine and vocals in support of the album.

Tiny Pause
On October 22, 2012, Corrales announced that the fourth album was almost complete, numbering 11 tracks so far. The final album was cut down to nine tracks and was officially released October 16, 2015.

Sunset in the Deep End
The fifth album from Yppah was released on February 7, 2020 on Future Archive Recordings.

Performed Live on KEXP in 2020 with Ali Coyle (vocals, bass) and Trent Moorman (drums).

Discography

Albums
You Are Beautiful at All Times (CD) Ninja Tune, 2006
They Know What Ghost Know (CD, MP3 bundle) Ninja Tune, 2009
Eighty One (CD) Ninja Tune, 2012
Tiny Pause (CD) Counter Records, 2015
Sunset in the Deep End (CD) Future Archive Recordings, 2020

Singles
"Again with the Subtitles" (CD) Ninja Tune, 2006
"D. Song" (feat. Anomie Belle) (CD) Ninja Tune, 2012
"Film Burn" (feat. Anomie Belle) (CD) Ninja Tune, 2012
"Bushmills" (digital) self-released, 2014

Remixes
"Harvest Dance" - DJ Kentaro feat. Hifana (Beat Records), 2007
"Coisa Do Gringo" (Heavyweight Gringos) - ZerodB (Ninja Tune), 2008

Production
The Use of Of (CD album) - Babel Fishh, 2005
 "A Photo of a Photograph" - Babel Fishh (Best Friends, CD compilation) Happy End Music, 2006
 "Coisa Do Gringo" - ZerodB (Heavyweight Gringos, CD album) Ninja Tune, 2008

Appearances
Heavyweight Gringos (CD, Album) Coisa Do Gringo (Yppah... Ninja Tune 2008

Track appearances
Best Friends (CDr, Comp, Ltd) Again With The Subtitles Happy End Music 2006
Ninja Tune - You Don't Know Us - A New Selection From Ninja Tune (CD, Promo) Again With The Subtitles Ninja Tune 2006
Zentertainment 2006 (CD) Again With The Subtitles Ninja Tune 2006
You Don't Know Ninja Cuts DJ Food's 1000 Mask Mix (CD, Mixed) Again With The Subtitles Ninja Tune 2008
You Don't Know Ninja Cuts DJ Food's 1000 Mask Mix (File, MP3) Again With The Subtitles Ninja Tune 2008
You Don't Know: Ninja Cuts (3xCD, Promo, Album, Comp) Again With The Subtitles Ninja Tune 2008
You Don't Know: Ninja Cuts (3xCD, Album) Again With The Subtitles Ninja Tune 2008
"D.Song" - Netflix show Altered Carbon (Season 2, Episode 2.)

References

External links
 Official website
 Official Facebook page

1981 births
Living people
American electronic musicians
Ninja Tune artists
Counter Records artists